Mission River is a coastal rural locality split between the Shire of Cook and the Aboriginal Shire of Napranum in Queensland, Australia.

Geography 
Within Mission River are the enclaves of Evans Landing, Nanum, Rocky Point, Trunding, and Weipa Airport, all of which are part of Weipa Town.

History 
Linngithigh (also known as Winda Winda and Linginiti) an Australian Aboriginal language spoken by the Linngithigh people. The Linngithigh language region includes landscape within the local government boundaries of the Cook Shire Council: Western Cape York, Winda Winda Creek, Mission River, and Archer River.

Thaynakwith (also known as Awngthim, Tainikuit and Winduwinda) is an Australian Aboriginal language spoken on Western Cape York in the Weipa area taking in Albatross Bay and Mission River. The language region includes areas within the local government boundaries of Weipa Town Council and Cook Shire.

The locality was probably named during 1895 by missionary J. Nicholas Hey and administrator John Douglas (Government Resident of Thursday Island from 1885 to 1904).

Education 
There are no schools in Mission River. The nearest primary and secondary school is Western Cape State College in Rocky Point in Weipa.

References 

Shire of Cook
Aboriginal Shire of Napranum
Coastline of Queensland
Localities in Queensland
Rivers of Queensland